Otto Miguel Cione Falcone (15 August 1875 – 6 September 1945) was a Uruguayan journalist (using the pseudonym Martin Flores), dramatist and writer. His most successful play was El arlequín (1902), which was performed throughout the Spanish-speaking world. His novel Lauracha (1911) ran through several editions and was made into a film.

Life
Otto Miguel Cione was born in Asunción, Paraguay on 15 August 1875.
His parents were Italian.
His father was Pascual M. Cione and his mother was Angela Flacone.
He moved to Uruguay at an early age, and became a citizen of that country.
His father was a leading doctor, and insisted that he attend university, but he did not finish his studies.
For some time he was Consul of Uruguay in Concordia, Entre Ríos, Argentina.
Later he was Section Head of the National Labor Office, and then Librarian in the Secondary Education Section of the Universidad de Montevideo.
In 1942 he was Librarian of the "Alfredo Vázquez Acevedo" Institute, the University's Section of Secondary and Higher Education.

Work

Cione began his career as a journalist with contributions to the Revista Nacional of Literature and Social Sciences, directed by José Enrique Rodó, Victor Pérez Petit and the Martínez Vigil brothers.
Cione contributed to the main newspapers and magazines of the Río de la Plata, particularly the Sunday supplement of La Mañana, Montevideo.
He published weekly articles in La Mañana in Montevideo under the pseudonym "Martín Flores".
His short story La atrevida operación del Dr. Otis, published in the humorous magazine Caras y Caretas in 1901, describes a partial brain transplant where the blood of the evil recipient rejects the lobe of a good person's brain.
He also wrote as a theatrical critic for the Argentine journals El Pais, El Diario, Critica, Ultima Hora, La Argentina and Idea Nacional and for the Montevideo journals Diario del Plata and El Censor.

Cione was the author of many successful theatrical plays.
Most of his work was produced in Argentina.
He was one of several Uruguayan authors who flourished in Buenos Aires during the period of realism in rioplatense theater at the turn of the 20th century, others being Ismael Cortinas (1884–1940), Edmundo Bianchi (1880–1965) and Orosmán Moratorio (1883–1929).
The most famous interpreter of his works was the actor Pablo Podestá.

Cione's play El gringo (1904) was inspired by the play La gringa (1902) by Florencio Sánchez.
El gringo tells of an artistocratic woman whose family has lost its money.
She marries a rich gringo who was once a poor immigrant.
They prove to have nothing in common, the marriage breaks down and eventually the gringo kills himself.
His tragedy El Arlequín (1908) was performed in all the theaters of South America and in theaters in Mexico, Costa Rica, Spain and Italy.
L'Arlequin, a tragedy in three acts concerning hereditary alcoholism, was inspired by Henrik Ibsen's Ghosts.
Cione won first prize out of 47 entries in the Dramatic Works competition of the National Theater in Buenos Aires with his Presente Griego (1913).

Cione has been described as a vigorous humorist in the tradition of Jonathan Swift and Mark Twain, and one of the basic supports of South American literature.
He wrote several novels.
He won second prize out of 110 entries with his Maula (1902) in the "El Pais" novel contest in Buenos Aires.
Cione's novel Lauracha was applauded by South American and Spanish critics and is considered one of the most important American novels of its genre.
The 4th edition, published in Spain, ran to 60,000 copies.
Lauracha was adapted for the screen by Hugo Mac Dougall.
The 1946 Argentine drama film Lauracha was directed by Arturo García Buhr and starring Amelia Bence.

Publications
Publications by Otto Miguel Cione include:

 
 
 
 
 
 Reprinted 1912, 1913, 1920
 
 5ª ed. 1933

Notes

Sources

1875 births
1945 deaths
People from Asunción
Paraguayan people of Italian descent
Uruguayan people of Paraguayan descent
Uruguayan people of Italian descent
Uruguayan male writers